Selayar is the main island of the Selayar Islands (Kepulauan Selayar). It lies off the coast of Cape Bira of South Sulawesi Province. The Selayar Straits separate it from the mainland of Sulawesi. Its main city is Benteng, towns to the south are Tanabau, Padang, Tile-tile, Pariangan, Galung, Layolo, Pa'garangang, Barangbarang, to Appattanah. To the north are Parak, Barugayya, Batangmata, Onto, and finally Bonelohe. Benteng is the starting point for diving tours.

Nearby dive sites
From Benteng, there is:
 Pulau Kambing (Goat island), located in the Selayar Straits.  It has white tipped and black tipped sharks, bumhead parrotfishes, scorpionfishes, cuttlefish or an octopus and with luck the zebra batfish.
 Selayar East: 1 to 2 hours, pelagic fishes, sometimes manta rays.

Other sites
 Mountain View: at Puncak. 1 hours trip to up hill.  From here you can see both eastern part and western part of Selayar's beaches.  When the wind blows from the west at Oct - March, Selayarese at the west side buy fish from the eastern part, as big wave smashes the west side.  And vice versa when the wind blows from the east on April - Sept, the big wave hit the eastern side.  People can choose the best place for diving, snorkeling or fishing all over the year in this island.

 Farmer Villages: 1 hour south from Benteng you can find Galung and Pariangang villages. Here people farm in a traditional way.

See also

Selayar Islands — for dive sites not in the immediate region around the island.
Wonderful Selayar — for Tour & Travel sites

Selayar Islands
Landforms of South Sulawesi
Islands of Sulawesi
Populated places in Indonesia